Empire College is a private for-profit college in Santa Rosa, California.  Founded in 1961, The college offers business and law degrees and is accredited by the Accrediting Council for Independent Colleges and Schools and the Committee of Bar Examiners of the State Bar of California. In February 2020, the school announced that it was closing its School of Business over the next 18 months, citing lower enrollment that was worsened by three years of wildfires.

History

The college was founded in 1961 by Henry Trione. It was first located in the Bank of America building on Old Courthouse Square. When the bank moved out in 1961, Trione bought the building and immediately gilded the top of the clock tower.

In 2012, Empire College received national recognition on the President's Higher Education Community Service Honor Roll with Distinction, one of two colleges in the state of California in that category. In 2013 Empire was one of the top 19 finalists in the nation, and in 2014 and 2015 Empire was again recognized "with distinction." The President's Higher Education Community Service Honor Roll, launched in 2006, annually highlights the role colleges and universities play in solving community problems and placing more students on a lifelong path of civic engagement by recognizing institutions that achieve meaningful, measureable outcomes in the communities they serve. Empire's service-based learning opportunities include a variety of free legal, tax, healthcare and wellness clinics.

In 2011, the U.S. Education Department reported that students who graduated from Empire College's business school were defaulting on student loans more than twice the national average. In 2019, the U.S. Department of Education reported that Empire College's 3-year cohort default rate for FY 2016 had dropped to 4.1 percent, a rate lower than that of Santa Rosa Junior College (8.5 percent) and the national average (10.1 percent).

See also
 Empire College School of Law

References

External links
 

Educational institutions established in 1961
Schools in Santa Rosa, California
Universities and colleges in Sonoma County, California
Colleges accredited by the Accrediting Council for Independent Colleges and Schools
For-profit universities and colleges in the United States
1961 establishments in California
Private universities and colleges in California